Hidden Identity is a 2015 South Korean television series starring Kim Bum, Park Sung-woong, Yoon So-yi and Lee Won-jong. It aired on tvN from June 16 to August 4, 2015, on Mondays and Tuesdays at 23:00 (KST) time slot for 16 episodes.

Synopsis
An undercover investigative squad of homicide detectives is formed, and their extra-legal methods include wiretapping, communications monitoring and deep-cover infiltration. Among its members are Cha Geon-woo (Kim Bum), a former ROKN SEAL and KNP SWAT member who pursues his targets doggedly and is secretly on a revenge mission after his girlfriend's death; principled and perceptive team leader Jang Moo-won (Park Sung-woong), who was granted permission to form the squad and will personally face the consequences if it fails; Jang Min-joo (Yoon So-yi), who's skilled in disguise, psychoanalysis and martial arts; and sly Choi Tae-pyung (Lee Won-jong), who gets information from shady back-alley connections.

Cast
 Kim Bum as Cha Geon-woo
 Park Sung-woong as Jang Moo-won
 Yoon So-yi as Jang Min-joo
 Kim Hye-yoon as young Jang Min-joo (ep. 14)
 Lee Won-jong as Choi Tae-pyung
 Kim Tae-hoon as Min Tae-in
 Im Kang-sung as Yoo Jin-woo
 Im Hyun-sung as Jin Duk-hoo
 Kim Min-jun as Teacher Jeong
 Kang Sung-jin as Nam In-ho
 Im Jong-yoon as Han Sang-joon
 Jung Do-won
 Woo Jung-gook
 Ryu Sung-hyun as Baek Pro
 Park Sung-taek
 Seo Yoo-jung as Eom In-kyung
 Jang Seo-hee as Jung Ji-won
 Kim Ha-rin as Yeon-hwa (Teacher Jung's wife)
 Kim Ji-won as Min Tae-hee
 Jung Jin as Chang-min 
 Hong Seung-jin as Sung-mo
 Choi Jeong-woo as Lee Myung-geun, President of arms manufacturing company

Ratings
In this table,  represent the lowest ratings and  represent the highest ratings.

References

External links
 Hidden Identity official tvN website 

 

TVN (South Korean TV channel) television dramas
2015 South Korean television series debuts
Korean-language television shows
South Korean crime television series
South Korean thriller television series